Claude André Dubois (born 24 April 1947) is a Canadian singer-songwriter.

Dubois was an early star of the Francophone musical Starmania. He was a vocalist in the Canadian famine relief song "Tears Are Not Enough" and was nominated Most Promising Male Vocalist at the Juno Awards of 1985.

In 2001, Dubois was the recipient of the National Achievement Award at the annual Francophone SOCAN Awards held in Montreal.

More recently, Dubois accused the Canadian Broadcasting Corporation of "racism" and "insulting Quebecers" after chopping all of the Quebec artists from the televised version of the 2008 Canadian Songwriters Hall of Fame gala in Toronto.

References

External links

1947 births
Living people
Canadian pop singers
Canadian male musical theatre actors
Canadian male singer-songwriters
French-language singers of Canada
French Quebecers
Singers from Montreal
Songwriters from Quebec
Writers from Montreal